Dwarf polypody is a common name for several ferns and may refer to:

Grammitis
Melpomene